Dana is a village in LaSalle County, Illinois, United States. As of the 2010 census, the village had a total population of 159, down from 171 in 2000. It is part of the Ottawa Micropolitan Statistical Area, as well as a part of the geographic region known as Streatorland.

History
Dana was originally called Martin. The present name is for Thomas Dana, a railroad official.  A post office has been in operation at Dana since 1873.

Geography
Dana is located at  (40.9564860, -88.9500470).

Demographics

As of the 2020 census there were 162 people, 40 households, and 25 families residing in the village. The racial makeup of the village was 91.98% White, 1.23% from other races, and 6.79% from two or more races. Hispanic or Latino of any race were 1.23% of the population.

There were 40 households, out of which 35.00% had children under the age of 18 living with them, 45.00% were married couples living together, 12.50% had a female householder with no husband present, and 37.50% were non-families. 30.00% of all households were made up of individuals, and 12.50% had someone living alone who was 65 years of age or older. The average household size was 3.16 and the average family size was 2.48.

The village's age distribution consisted of 26.3% under the age of 18, 5.1% from 18 to 24, 27.2% from 25 to 44, 31.3% from 45 to 64, and 10.1% who were 65 years of age or older. The median age was 36.2 years. For every 100 females, there were 83.3 males. For every 100 females age 18 and over, there were 78.0 males.

The median income for a household in the village was $47,500, and the median income for a family was $56,250. Males had a median income of $46,250 versus $14,286 for females. The per capita income for the village was $20,816. About 8.0% of families and 7.2% of the population were below the poverty line, including 8.3% of those under age 18 and none of those age 65 or over.

References

Ottawa, IL Micropolitan Statistical Area
Villages in LaSalle County, Illinois
1873 establishments in Illinois